Chelodesmidae, is a millipede family of order Polydesmida. The family includes 219 genera. Two new genera were described in 2012.

Genera

A
Achromoporus 
Afolabina 
Alassodesmus 
Allarithmus 
Alocodesmus 
Alyssa 
Amphelictogon 
Amphipeltis 
Ancholeptodesmus 
Ancylochetus 
Aneurydesmus 
Angelodesmus 
Anisodesmus 
Ankylophallus 
Antillodesmus 
Antrogonodesmus 
Aplopododesmus 
Arthromachus 
Arthrosolaenomeris 
Astrophogonus 
Attemsiella 
Atylophor

B
Basacantha 
Baianassa 
Batodesmus 
Beatadesmus 
Belonodesmus 
Benoitesmus 
Biaporus 
Biporodesmus 
Brachyurodesmus 
Brasilodesmus 
Brasiloschubartia

C
Callistocilla 
Camptomorpha 
Camptomorphoides 
Cantabrodesmus 
Caracodesmus 
Caraibodesmus 
Carlopeltis 
Carloporus 
Catharodesmus 
Cayenniola 
Cearodesmus 
Centrogaster 
Cheirodesmus 
Cheirogonus 
Chelodesmus 
Chondrodesmoides 
Chondrodesmus 
Chondropeltis 
Chondrotropis 
Colombodesmus 
Congesmus 
Cordilleronomus 
Cordyloconus 
Cordyloporella 
Cordyloporus 
Cormodesmus 
Corystauchenus 
Craterodesmus 
Cryptoporatia 
Cryptosolenomeris 
Cubodesmus 
Cyclorhabdoides 
Cyclorhabdus 
Cypraeogona 
Cyrtaphe

D
Delirus 
Desmacrides 
Desmoleptus 
Dialysogon 
Diaphorodesmus 
Diaphorodesmoides 
Diarcuaria 
Dirharbdophallus 
Doidesmus 
Drepanodesmus 
Dromodesmus 
Dyoparyphe

E
Ecuadopeltis 
Ellipodesmus 
Entelopus 
Epiporopeltis 
Eressea 
Erythrodesmus 
Ethophallus 
Eucampesmella 
Eucampesmus 
Eucordyloporus 
Eumastostethus 
Eurydesmus 
Euthydesmus 
Eutyporhachis

G
Gangugia 
Geminodesmus 
Gitadesmus 
Gonioleptodesmus 
Gonorygma 
Goyazodesmus 
Grallodesmus 
Granmadesmus 
Graphidochirus 
Guayapeltis

H
Harpagodesmus 
Henrisaussurea 
Heptoporodesmus 
Heteropeltis 
Hoffmanodesmus 
Hypodesmus 
Hypselodesmus

I
Igaraparana 
Iguazus 
Incodesmus 
Inconus 
Iphyria 
Isidrona 
Isodesmus

K
Kisantus 
Kyphopyge

L
Lasiomazus 
Leiodesmus 
Leiomodesmus 
Leptherpum 
Leptodesmus 
Lepturodesmus 
Liorhabdus 
Lipodesmus 
Loomisiola 
Lyrodesmus

M
†Maatidesmus 
Macrocoxodesmus 
Mallotodesmus 
Manfredia 
Manfrediodesmus 
Maracayopus 
Melanodesmus 
Mesodesmus 
Micronchodesmus 
Morogorius 
Morphotelus

N
Neocamptomorpha 
Neocordyloporus

O
Obiricodesmus 
Odontokrepis 
Odontopeltis 
Odontotropis 
Oncoleptodesmus 
Oreodesmus

P
Paltophorus 
Pandirodesmus 
Pansararium 
Paracordyloporus 
Parastenonia 
Peltoeurydesmus 
Perudesmus 
Peruprion 
Phantasmodesmus 
Phlyzakium 
Phylactophallus 
Pimodesmus 
Platinodesmus 
Platyurodesmus 
Plectrogonodesmus
Pleuroarium 
Plicatodesmus 
Plusioporodesmus 
Podiscodesmus 
Pogonodesmus 
Prepodesmus 
Priodesmus 
Proletus 
Pseudoeurydesmella 
Pseudoeurydesmus 
Pseudoleptodesmus 
Pterygiodesmus 
Ptyxesmus

Q
Quisquicia

R
Raima 
Rhacophorus 
Rhaphandra 
Ricodesmus 
Rupidesmus

S
Sandalodesmus 
Scaptodesmus 
Schistides 
Scolopopleura 
Solaenorhabdus 
Specioporus 
Stachyproctus 
Stenonia 
Stirosoma 
Stongylomorpha 
Storthotropis 
Strongylosomides 
Synecheporus

T
Talamancia 
Tanzaniella 
Telonychopus 
Tessarithys 
Thanatomimus 
Thaumatodesmus 
Thymodesmus 
Tidasus 
Tomodesmus 
Trachelodesmus 
Triadesmus 
Trichomorpha 
Tuberodesmus 
Tunochilus 
Tylodesmus 
Typophallus

U
Uberlandiodesmus

V
Vigilia

W
Watoporus

X
Xeneurydesmus 
Xyodesmus

Y
Yanadesmus

Z
Zigwadesmus

References

Polydesmida
Millipede families